Hiram J. Brendlinger (April 15, 1825 – May 14, 1894) was an American politician.  He served as Mayor of Denver, Colorado from 1864 to 1865.

Biography
He was born in 1825 in New Hanover, Pennsylvania to John Brendlinger and Theresa Edmonia Herman. He served as Mayor of Denver, Colorado from 1864 to 1865. He died on May 14, 1894.

References

Mayors of Denver
1825 births
1894 deaths
19th-century American politicians